The Office of the Independent Adjudicator for Higher Education (OIA) is a company limited by guarantee and a registered charity which has been designated under the Higher Education Act 2004 to run the higher education student complaints scheme within England and Wales. The OIA's rules outline the complaints that it can and cannot review, these contain new rules from the Consumer Rights Act 2015. The OIA has no regulatory powers over higher education providers, such as universities or colleges, and is unable to punish or fine them. The OIA is a recognised ADR.

History 
As a result of recommendations from the Dearing Report, consultations began about an independent body to which students could make complaints. A white paper in 2003 set out the government goal of establishing the body via legislation. The OIA was established in 2003 and began running a voluntary scheme in 2004 with it becoming the designated operator of the student complaints scheme in 2005. The OIA has effectively replaced the role of the visitor, as student complaints were specifically excluded from the remit of the visitor in the Higher Education Act 2004. By law, all higher education bodies are required to abide by the rules of the OIA's complaints scheme. The OIA is not a "public authority" and therefore not covered by the Freedom of Information Act 2000 or required to answer requests for information. but is covered by a subject access request.

Student complaints scheme 

The OIA is funded by compulsory annual subscriptions from over 800 higher education providers that are members of its scheme, receiving £5.4 million in 2019 from subscriptions. The OIA's board of directors has 15 members.

The OIA looks at a wide range of "procedural issues" but it does not adjudicate on issues of "academic judgment". It functions by seeking information from both complainant and the higher education institution and allowing each party to comment. Results can include payment of compensation from the higher education institution where the complaint is upheld and so far compensation payments have exceeded £700,000 with the largest single award being £45,000 compensating a student for legal expenses. In 2015, 20 complainants in all received more than £5,000.  The other 210 received an average of less than £1,500. In 2010, the number of complaints represented just 0.05 per cent of the 2.2 million students enrolled in higher education. 

In 2019, only 3% of complaints reviewed by the OIA were Justified, 11% were Partly Justified, 9% Settled, 17% were classed as Not Eligible, 10% were withdrawn and 50% were Not Justified. The OIA has discretion to publish summaries of complaints.

The OIA is required to report to the board and publish in his annual report any non-compliance with recommendations by a university. 

In a report commissioned by the OIA, titled Student Satisfaction with the Office of the Independent Adjudicator for Higher Education, said "in all, the predominant emotions felt by students at the end of the OIA process are highly negative, and very similar to those felt by students at the end of the HEI process that led them to the OIA."

Lord Justice Longmore in R (Sandhar) v OIA considered whether, because the OIA is funded by higher education providers, it is unable to avoid the appearance of bias. Lord Justice Longmore concluded "In all these circumstances I just do not see how it can be said that any fair-minded and informed observer could say that there was a real possibility that the OIA in general or its Independent Adjudicator or any individual case-handler was biased in favour of the [higher education provider] under scrutiny in any particular case or lacked independence in any way".

References

External links 
 OIA website

Universities and colleges in the United Kingdom
Higher education in the United Kingdom